Gorev may refer to
Vladimir Gorev (1900–1938), Belarusian military officer
Gorev Island in Antarctica